The Sanhe Tile Kiln is a former tile manufacturing factory in Dashu District, Kaohsiung, Taiwan.

History
The original building of the factory was established in 1918. The building used to be the Shunanhao Tile Kiln. It has even since undergone name changing twice, such as Yuan Shun-an Tile Kiln. In 1975, it was renamed to Sanhe Tile Kiln. In 2001, parts of the building was registered as historical site by the government.

Architecture
The building is made of straw-mixed bricks, red bricks and roof tiles fired in the kiln.

Exhibition
The former factory gives explanation on brick history, traditional brick production, ancient kiln style, brick community and creative development of bricks and tiles.

Transportation
The former factory is accessible within walking distance north of Jiuqutang Station of Taiwan Railways.

See also
 List of tourist attractions in Taiwan

References

External links
  

1918 establishments in Taiwan
Buildings and structures in Kaohsiung
Kilns in Taiwan
Tourist attractions in Kaohsiung